The Port of Bristol Police (PoBP) is a ports police force with responsibility to protect the port complexes and community situated at the mouth of the River Avon on the border between Bristol and Somerset. Officers are attested under powers in legislation derived from the Harbours, Docks and Piers Clauses Act 1847.

The PoBP has existed at the Avonmouth Docks since 1884, but has been in its present form since the end of the Second World War. The PoBP in modern times is responsible for the policing and certain security measures at Avonmouth Docks, Royal Portbury Dock and the trading estates owned by The Bristol Port Company that are situated at the outskirts of the port areas.

First Corporate Shipping Limited, trading as The Bristol Port Company, is the statutory undertaker (within the meaning of the Police and Criminal Evidence Act 1984) of the harbour area and is solely responsible for financing and employing the PoBP.

History

The Port of Bristol Police started as The Bristol Docks Company in 1803. The Bristol Docks Act 1803 created the company and provided for the improvement of the Port and Harbour of Bristol. A force of 51 men was duly appointed as constables under this act and were stationed in a police office building at Wapping Wharf, adjacent to the Bristol Dock Company office at Underfall Yard, Bristol City Docks.

In 1848 the Bristol Dock Company was taken into the ownership of Bristol City Council and began trading as the Port of Bristol Authority. It was then deemed unnecessary by the new authority to continue with the inherited police force, as Bristol had by then in 1842 formed a River Police section of the Bristol Constabulary. In 1877 the Bristol and Portishead Pier and Railway Company formed a small police force at Portishead Dock composed of a sergeant and six constables. A force of similar size was also formed by the Bristol Port and Channel Dock Company at Avonmouth in 1878. These two dock companies were subsequently acquired by the Port of Bristol Authority in 1884 and the present Port of Bristol Police Force were then reformed from its beginnings in 1803.

Structure
The Chief Officer of the Port,is usually an Inspector or Chief Inspector and an experienced former territorial police officer. The Chief Officer is also the  Port Facility Security Officer, under the International Shipping and Port Facility Security code.

Multi-agency approach
Whenever possible, the port police adopts a multi-agency approach to dealing with border control and other issues arising in the port area. Whilst not adopting the role of the Border Force, Driver and Vehicle Standards Agency or any other agency, the port police often act on their behalf when dealing with offenders.

Port police support officer
The PoB also has police support officers, who are not constables, but provide non-warranted uniform support to the Port Police. Their uniform is similar to Home Office PCSOs.

See also
 Law enforcement in the United Kingdom
 List of law enforcement agencies in the United Kingdom, Crown Dependencies and British Overseas Territories
 Ports Police in the United Kingdom

References

External links

Organisations based in Bristol
Port of Bristol
Port police forces of the United Kingdom
Police forces of England